Il Conciliatore was a progressive bi-weekly scientific and literary journal, influential in the early Risorgimento. The journal was published in Milan from September 1818 until October 1819 when it was closed by the Austrian censors. Its writers included Ludovico di Breme, Giuseppe Nicolini and Silvio Pellico. The latter wrote articles for the magazine supporting the publication of novels in Italy.

References

Encyclopædia Britannica, "Il Conciliatore", Encyclopædia Britannica Online, 2009. Retrieved 13 October 2009.

1818 establishments in Italy
1819 disestablishments in Italy
Biweekly magazines published in Italy
Defunct literary magazines published in Italy
Italian-language magazines
Italian unification
Magazines established in 1818
Magazines disestablished in 1819
Magazines published in Milan
Science and technology magazines
Banned magazines